Noah Nurmi (born 6 February 2001) is a Finnish footballer who plays for FC Inter Turku.

Career

Esbjerg fB
In December 2017 Danish club Esbjerg fB confirmed, that they had signed Nurmi on a long-term contract, after a good performance for his club KäPa against Esbjerg in the UEFA Youth League. Nurmi got his debut for Esbjerg fB on 12 July 2019 against FC Midtjylland.

On 28 September 2019, Nurmi signed a new contract until the summer 2022. Nurmi was loaned out to FC Inter Turku on 31 January 2020 until the end of the year. On 1 February 2021, Nurmi was sold permanently to FC Inter Turku.

References

External links
Noah Nurmi at Esbjerg fB's website

Living people
2001 births
Association football defenders
Finnish footballers
Finnish expatriate footballers
Esbjerg fB players
FC Inter Turku players
Danish Superliga players
Finnish expatriate sportspeople in Denmark
Expatriate men's footballers in Denmark